The United States Air Force's 301st Intelligence Squadron is an intelligence unit located at Joint Base Elmendorf-Richardson, Alaska.

The squadron's first predecessor was organized in 1942 as the 138th Signal Radio Intelligence Company, a signals intelligence unit.  The company served in the Southwest Pacific Theater during World War II, then moved to Japan to join the occupation forces.  Redesignated 1st Radio Squadron, Mobile in 1946, the unit transferred from the United States Army to the United States Air Force in 1949 and served in Japan until inactivation in May 1955.

The squadron's other predecessor was organized at Misawa Air Base, Japan in 1978 as the 6920th Security Squadron.  In October 1993, the two units were consolidated as the 301st.  It continued to serve at Misawa until June 2014, when it moved to its present location.

Mission
The squadron as partner of the 381st Intelligence Squadron at the Alaska Mission Operations Center. The unit's mission is to collect, process, analyze, and report signals intelligence on adversary operations, capabilities and intentions. Additionally, unit personnel conduct communications, maintenance and administrative actions supporting site operations and as provide tactical analytic support to combat units.

History

World War II
The first predecessor of the squadron was activated in February 1942 as the 138th Signal Intelligence Company at Fort George Wright, Washington. It received it initial cadre on 25 February drawing from the 404th Signal Company, Aviation; 434th Signal Maintenance Company, Aviation and 39th Signal Platoon, Air Base. However, it was April before a substantial number of people were assigned to the company. The company continued training at Fort Wright until May 1943, when they departed for shipment to the Southwest Pacific, Staging through Fort Dix, New Jersey.

In August 1942, the squadron moved forward to Port Moresby, New Guinea to begin operations. The squadron continued radio intercept operations of Japanese radio transmissions until VJ Day.

Following the war, the unit was transferred from the Army Signal Corps to the Air Corps and redesignated the 1st Radio Squadron.  However, it remained part of Army Security Agency for more than a year after the United States Air Force became independent, not transferring to United States Air Force Security Service until 1 February 1949.

Korean War
The squadron remained in Japan after the war with the mission of monitoring Soviet air and air defense signals. When the North Koreans crossed the 38th parallel and invaded in June 1950, the squadron's commander ordered its vehicles to be laagered on the Johnson Air Base football field in case of a parachute attack on Japan.  A detachment of the squadron moved to Korea on 15 July 1950.  However Fifth Air Force had established its own ad hoc signals intelligence party near Seoul, which commandeered the 1st Squadron's equipment.  However, additional mobile radio intercept detachments began arriving before the end of the year.

In March 1951, squadron operators in Japan began picking up voice communications in Russian between ground controllers and Mikoyan-Gurevich MiG-15 fighters.  By April, the squadron had established a mobile van in central Korea, which passed information on MiGs to the Fifth Air Force tactical air control center, which passed it on to American North American F-86 Sabres, disguising the information to make it appear that it was coming from radar ground stations, even though the radio intercept van could provide warning of Soviet aircraft movements well beyond the range of American radars.  Separate stations were established for intercepting enemy morse code signals dealing with both enemy and friendly traffic.  After September 1951, these operations were consolidated in Seoul.  The information provided by squadron operators has been credited as the major factor in the increased kill ratio of Sabre pilots over the MiG-15 in Korea starting in mid-1951, especially in view of analysis that indicated that by the fall of 1952 90% of MiG pilots in Korea were Russians. In January 1951, the squadron moved to Misawa Air Base, Japan, where one of the first Elephant Cage high frequency direction finding antenna assemblies was located. The squadron was inactivated in May 1955, and its mission, personnel and equipment transferred to the 6921st Radio Squadron, Mobile.

6920th Electronic Security Group

The second squadron antecedent was activated as the 6920th Security Squadron at Misawa Air Base, Japan in October 1978.  When USAF Security Service became Electronic Security Command, the squadron was expanded to group size as the 6920th Electronic Security Group.

In October 1992, the unit became one of the operational components, with the Naval Security Group Activity, Misawa, a Marine company, and the 750th Military Intelligence Company, in the Misawa Cryptologic Operations Center.

301st Intelligence Squadron
In October 1993, the 1st Radio Squadron (which had been disbanded in 1985), was reconstituted and consolidated with the 6920th Group and the consolidated squadron was named the 301st Intelligence Squadron. The squadron mission at Misawa was to process time-critical combat information for unified and specified commands and the National Command Authorities. It conducted satellite communications processing and reporting. The 301st provided sensitive communications support to aircraft. It operated and maintained $500,000,000 of electronic equipment.

After the massive tsunami and devastating earthquake measuring 9.0 on the Richter Scale struck the coast of Japan in 2011, Airmen of the 301st devoted countless hours alongside other Americans and Japanese during Operation Tomodachi by assisting with clean-up and restoration efforts throughout Japan.

In June 2014, as the Misawa operations center closed and intelligence personnel there were reduced by more than 500 people, the squadron moved from Misawa to Joint Base Elmendorf-Richardson when the intelligence center at Misawa closed.

Lineage
 1st Radio Squadron, Mobile
 Constituted as the 138th Signal Radio Intelligence Company on 7 February 1942
 Activated on 14 February 1942
 Redesignated 138th Signal Radio Intelligence Company, Aviation on 29 October 1943
 Redesignated 1st Radio Squadron, Mobile (J) on 29 February 1944
 Redesignated 1st Radio Squadron, Mobile on 14 November 1946
 Inactivated on 8 May 1955
 Disbanded on 15 June 1983.
 Reconstituted on 1 October 1993 and consolidated with the 6920th Electronic Security Group as the 301st Intelligence Squadron

 6920th Electronic Security Group
 Designated as the 6920th Security Squadron  on 1 October 1978 and activated
 Redesignated 6920th Electronic Security Group on 1 August 1979
 Consolidated with the 1st Radio Squadron, Mobile as the 301st Intelligence Squadron

 301st Intelligence Squadron
 Consolidated unit designated 301st Intelligence Squadron 1 October 1993 – present

Assignments
 Second Air Force, 14 February 1942
 Fifth Air Force, 12 June 1943
 Army Security Agency, Pacific, 4 January 1946 (attached to Fifth Air Force after 9 February 1946)
 United States Air Force Security Service, 1 February 1949 (remained attached to Fifth Air Force, 35th Fighter Wing (later 35th Fighter-Interceptor Wing), 1 July 1949, 3d Bombardment Wing, 1 April 1950; 35th Fighter-Interceptor Wing, 14 August 1950; 6162d Air Base Wing, 1 December 1950; 35th Fighter-Interceptor Wing after 25 May 1951)
 6920 Security Group (later 6920 Security Wing), 16 February 1952 – 8 May 1955 (remained attached to 35th Fighter-Interceptor Wing, 6016th Air Base Wing, 28 January 1953; 49th Fighter-Bomber Wing, 18 November 1953 – 8 May 1955)
 United States Air Force Security Service (later Electronic Security Command), 1 Oct 1978-c. Aug 1979 (attached to 6112th Air Base Wing)
 Electronic Security, Pacific (later Pacific Electronic Security Division, 692d Intelligence Wing, 692d Intelligence Group), 30 September 1980
 373d Intelligence, Surveillance and Reconnaissance Group, 7 September 2000 – present

Stations

 Fort George Wright, Washington, 14 February 1942 – 5 May 1943
 Brisbane, Australia, 15 June 1943
 Port Moresby, New Guinea, by c. 5 August 1943
 Nadzab, New Guinea, by 21 February 1944
 Biak, New Guinea, September 1944
 Clark Field, Philippines, 31 May 1945
 Yokota Air Base, Japan, 20 December 1945
 Irumagawa Air Base (later Johnson Air Base), Japan, by 1 February 1946
 Misawa Air Base, Japan, 26 January 1953 – 8 May 1955
 Misawa Air Base, Japan, 1 October 1978
 Joint Base Elmendorf-Richardson, Alaska, 1 July 2014 – present

Awards and campaigns

See also

MiG Alley
 List of United States Air Force squadrons

References

Notes

Citations

Bibliography

External links
 
 
 

Intelligence squadrons of the United States Air Force
Military units and formations in Alaska
Military units and formations of the United States in the Cold War
Military units and formations established in 1942
1942 establishments in Washington (state)